Marie Bouchard (born 7 December 1993) is a French long-distance runner. In 2019, she competed in the senior women's race at the 2019 IAAF World Cross Country Championships held in Aarhus, Denmark. She finished in 62nd place.

In 2015, she won the silver medal in the women's 3000 steeplechase event at the 2015 French Athletics Championships.

In 2018, she competed in the women's 5000 metres at the 2018 Mediterranean Games held in Tarragona, Spain. She finished in 6th place.

References

External links 
 

Living people
1993 births
Place of birth missing (living people)
French female long-distance runners
French female cross country runners
Athletes (track and field) at the 2018 Mediterranean Games
Mediterranean Games competitors for France
21st-century French women